Typhoon Bess struck Japan in early August 1982, resulting in severe damage. The eleventh tropical storm, sixth typhoon, and first super typhoon of the 1982 Pacific typhoon season, the system first developed on July 21. Two days later, it was upgraded into a tropical storm, and subsequently began to intensify while tracking northwest. Bess attained typhoon intensity on July 24, before it briefly turned southwest. After turning north-northwest, the typhoon entered a period of rapid intensification and late on July 28 reached peak winds of 230 km/h (145 mph). After turning north, Bess began to weaken as it encountered less favorable conditions. On August 1, Bess was downgraded into a tropical storm. Shortly after that, the storm struck southeastern Japan, and on August 2 merged with a low pressure area atop of the Sea of Japan.

Typhoon Bess cut through a  swath that included the most populated portion of Japan. Bess caused ¥591.6 billion (US$2.38 billion) in damage and 95 casualties. Furthermore, 119 others were hurt. Four people were killed due to landslides, while two other individuals were buried alive. A series of landslides stranded about 2,000 people, including 1,500 children. In all, 43 dwellings were destroyed and 17,000 homes were flooded. A total of 59 roads were impassable, 42 bridges were destroyed and 785 landslides occurred. Fifteen railway lines were disrupted due to torrential rainfall. In addition, 2,857 acres of farmland were flooded, 101 bridges were washed out and roads were damaged at more than 1,000 locations. Two boats sunk. Roughly 25,000 people were displaced. Following the storm, 2,100 policeman and firefighters dug through debris to rescue people. Bess was the deadliest typhoon to hit Japan since Tip of 1979. Following the season, the name Bess was retired from the list of names.

Meteorological history

A large monsoon trough was anchored south of Guam towards the end of July. By July 21, three areas of disturbed weather had formed. Although the westernmost disturbance dissipated, the easternmost two continued to develop, one of which would later become Typhoon Andy. A Tropical Cyclone Formation Alert (TCFA) was issued for the easternmost system at 1900 UTC on July 21 as sea level pressures fell and convection increased within the vicinity of the disturbance. After becoming better organized, the Japan Meteorological Agency (JMA) started monitoring the system. Later on July 22, the Joint Typhoon Warning Center (JTWC) started monitoring the same system as it developed rainbands and a further increase in thunderstorm activity. Initially, the JTWC correctly predicted the low to move northwest. Hurricane Hunters indicated that the low and mid-level centers were not vertically aligned. On July 23, both the JMA and JTWC upped the depression into a tropical storm. Bess then began to intensify. At 0600 UTC on July 24, Bess was upgraded to a severe tropical storm by the JMA. After the formation of an eye, both agencies classified Bess as a typhoon.

By July 24, Typhoon Bess began to move north-northwest and slow down due to the westward building of the subtropical ridge to the north. The JTWC expected Bess to turn west; however, Bess instead turned southwest on July 25 due to interactions with a trough. The typhoon then turned north-northwest while slowly intensifying. On July 28, the system turned northwest along the southwestern edge of the ridge. Subsequently, Typhoon Bess entered an episode of rapid deepening. At this time, Typhoon Bess was located 460 km (285 mi) to the southeast of Iwo Jima.

After slowing down further, Bess curved north along the southern periphery of a weakness in the subtropical ridge. Even though the JTWC expected Bess to recurve well east of Japan within 36 hours, this did not materialize. Bess continued to weaken while accelerating. The next day, August 1, the JMA downgraded Bess into a severe tropical storm. Later that morning, the JMA downgraded Bess into a tropical storm. Around this time, the tropical storm made landfall along central Honshu. Shortly thereafter, the JTWC reported that Bess was no longer a typhoon. On August 2, Bess merged with a low pressure area over the Sea of Japan. The JMA ceased monitoring the typhoon midday on August 3.

Impact and aftermath

Typhoon Bess cut through a  swath across the most populated portions of Japan; damage was reported in 30 of the 45 provinces. As a precaution, flood warnings were issued near Tokyo, which warned of possible landslides. An "alert" was issued for the Bonin Islands for vessels.

Overall, Super Typhoon Bess was responsible for ¥591.6 billion (US$2.38 billion) in damage and 95 fatalities. According to police reports, 26 people were initially missing. A total of 119 were hurt. Four people were killed in Osaka due to landslides, while two people were buried alive in Yokohama via mudslides. At the foot of Mount Fuji, a series of mudslides buried 36 vehicles, killed one person and injured five policemen. The landslides stranded approximately 2,000 persons, including 1,500 primary school children on a camping trip. In Mie, Bess was considered the worst storm to affect the city in 23 years, where 17 fatalities occurred and seven were initially listed missing. Elsewhere, in Nara, a couple was killed and a boy was hurt. Throughout western Japan, five people were rendered missing in heavy rains that caused at least five landslides and damaged 15 automobiles. Along Tokyo Bay, high waves from Typhoon Bess left windows 11 stories high coated with salt. Although Tokyo was on the eastern edge of the storm, large trees were uprooted nevertheless due to high winds. Five people were wounded in the city. Many cars and trucks were stranded due to mudslides; air traffic was also paralyzed.

In all, 43 dwellings were destroyed and 17,000 homes were flooded. Due to the storm, 59 roads were impassable. In addition, 42 bridges were destroyed and 785 landslides occurred. According to railroad authorities, 15 railroad lines were either totally or partially disrupted due to torrential rains, forcing the cancellation of 27 scheduled trains and delaying 211 others. Police reports suggest that  of farmland were flooded, 101 bridges were washed out, and roads were damaged at 1,094 places. Additionally, 25 ships ran aground or were washed away and two boats sunk. A total of 25,000 individuals were left homeless, including 24,702 people that were evacuated from their homes.

Following the storm, 2,100 police and firemen dug furiously through mud and debris in search of the missing. The name Bess was previously retired in 1974 and replaced with Bonnie. However, when the list of typhoon names was changed to incorporate male names in 1979, the name was re-introduced to the roster. After this usage of the name Bess, it was retired for the second time and was replaced with Brenda. This marked the only occasion where a single name was removed twice in the same basin.

See also

 List of tropical cyclones
 Typhoon Nangka (2015)
 Typhoon Judy (1982)- also hit Japan the following month
 Typhoon Tip
 Typhoon Tokage (2004)
 Typhoon Hagibis

Notes

References

External links

 Bess's Report
 Unisys Storm Path
 Digital typhoon track

Retired Pacific typhoons
1982 Pacific typhoon season
Typhoons in Japan
Typhoon Bess
Typhoons
Bess